Terrence Desmond McKibbin Kane (10 May 1952 – 19 October 2012) was an Irish cricketer. He played one List A match for Ireland in 1981.

References

External links
 

1952 births
2012 deaths
Irish cricketers
Sportspeople from Derry (city)
Cricketers from Northern Ireland